was a Japanese mathematician working in algebraic topology who proved the Hattori–Stong theorem. Hattori was the president of the Mathematical Society of Japan in 1989–1991.

Hattori received a Doctorate in Science from the University of Tokyo in 1959 with Shokichi Iyanaga as his advisor. He then joined the faculty of the University of Tokyo. Between 1966 and 1968 Hattori worked as a visiting scholar at both Johns Hopkins University and Yale University.

After retirement from University of Tokyo, Hattori was invited to teach at Meiji University from 1991 to 1999, when they opened mathematics major in 1989. Professor Hiroko Morimoto invited Drs. Akio Hattori and Hiroshi Fujita from the University of Tokyo, and Dr. Shiro Goto from Nihon University joined to launch a research and educational system for algebra, geometry and analytics.

Publications

Co-authored

Footnotes

References
 - Biography and publication list.
  
 Its English version which appeared in ALGTOP-L, a mailing list concerning algebraic topology.

1929 births
2013 deaths
20th-century Japanese mathematicians
21st-century Japanese mathematicians
Academic staff of the University of Tokyo
University of Tokyo alumni
Deaths from cancer in Japan